Zaz va Mahru District is a district (bakhsh) in Aligudarz County, Lorestan Province, Iran. At the 2006 census, its population was 11,440, in 1,982 families.  Zaz va Mahru has one city Shulehabad-e Olya.

References 

Districts of Lorestan Province
Aligudarz County